Jacky Jamael Nascimento Godmann (born 14 April 1999) is a Brazilian canoeist. His family has a tradition in the sport, with uncle Vilson Nascimento winning a two medals in the 2007 Pan American Games, and his aunt Valdenice do Nascimento getting a bronze medal in the 2015 edition. He competed in the men's C-2 1000 metres event at the 2020 Summer Olympics alongside Isaquias Queiroz as a replacement for Queiroz's usual partner Erlon Silva,  finishing in fourth place. In the same C-1 1000 meters race that Queiroz got the gold medal, Godmann went to the quarterfinals.

References

External links

1999 births
Living people
Brazilian male canoeists
Olympic canoeists of Brazil
Canoeists at the 2020 Summer Olympics
Sportspeople from Bahia
Brazilian people of German descent
21st-century Brazilian people